Jackie Wright (1905–1989) was a British comedian.

Jackie Wright may also refer to:

Jackie Wright (footballer) (1926–2005), English footballer

See also
Jacky Wright, British technology executive
Jack Wright (disambiguation)